Gupovo is a rural locality in Makarovsky Selsoviet Rural Settlement, Kurchatovsky District, Kursk Oblast, Russia. Population:

Geography 
The village is located on the Seym River, 65 km from the Russia–Ukraine border, 36 km west of Kursk, 6 km north of the district center – the town Kurchatov, 10.5 km from the selsoviet center – Makarovka.

 Climate
Gupovo has a warm-summer humid continental climate (Dfb in the Köppen climate classification).

Transport 
Gupovo is located 27 km from the federal route  Crimea Highway, 6 km from the road of regional importance  (Kursk – Lgov – Rylsk – border with Ukraine), on the road of intermunicipal significance  (Seym River – Mosolovo – Nizhneye Soskovo), 6 km from the nearest railway halt Kurchatow (railway line Lgov I — Kursk).

The rural locality is situated 42 km from Kursk Vostochny Airport, 133 km from Belgorod International Airport and 246 km from Voronezh Peter the Great Airport.

References

Notes

Sources

Rural localities in Kurchatovsky District, Kursk Oblast